Advertising columns or Morris columns are cylindrical outdoor sidewalk structures with a characteristic style that are used for advertising and other purposes. They are common throughout Germany including its capital Berlin, where the first 100 columns were installed in 1855. Advertising columns were invented by the German printer Ernst Litfaß in 1854. Therefore, they are known as Litfaßsäulen (Litfass columns).

In France, the columns are called colonnes Morris after Gabriel Morris, a printer, who held the concession for advertising in 1868. They were originally built by La Société Fermière des Colonnes Morris. Today, they are mostly built and maintained by the JCDecaux company, which purchased the original company in 1986.

Development
The idea of advertising pillars came about in order to combat rampant advertising and graffiti.
Ernst Litfaß suggested that pillars should be built all over the city. People could then place their advertisements on these pillars. On 5 December 1854, after years of proceedings, Berlin's chief of police, Karl Ludwig von Hinkeldey authorized Litfaß' Annoncier-Säulen. Litfaß had exclusive rights to build these columns until 1865.

Purposes
Advertising columns are typically used to display advertisements in the form of posters, mainly theater, cinema, nightclub, and concert announcements. Some are motorized and rotate very slowly, and others house Sanisettes or telephone booths. In 2017, anti-pollution Morris columns were tested in Paris; they contained materials which filter out particles from the air in order to mitigate carbon dioxide pollution. At the beginning of 2006, there were 790 Morris columns in Paris; more than two hundred were to be removed.

Cultural references
 In the film The Third Man, Harry Lime (played by Orson Welles) uses one of these columns as an escape route to the sewer system under Vienna.
 In the film Gremlins 2, Billy Peltzer (played by Zach Galligan) and Daniel Clamp (played by John Glover), use one of these columns as an escape route from the Gremlin-infested Clamp Building.
 In the film Men in Black II, Agent K (played by Tommy Lee Jones) and Agent J (played by Will Smith), use a column as an escape route from an alien-infested MiB Headquarters.
 On 1 July 2020, Google celebrated the advertising column "Litfaßsäule" with a Doodle.

See also
 Billboard
Street furniture

References

External links

 Mobilier Urbain – Inventory of street installations in Paris (in French)

Advertising
Street furniture